Charles Sumner Burch (June 30, 1855 – December 20, 1920) was an American Protestant Episcopal clergyman who served as Bishop of New York from 1919 till his death in 1920.

Biography
He was graduated from the University of Michigan, and entered the publishing business in Chicago. From 1897 to 1905 he was editor of the Grand Rapids' Evening Press. He had taken deacon's orders in 1895 and was ordained priest in 1905.

He was ordained to the Diaconate in 1895 by Bishop McLaren, and to the Priesthood in 1905 by Bishop Greer. After being rector of Saint Andrew's, Staten Island, New York City, for six years he was consecrated suffragan bishop of New York in 1911. He succeeded David Hummell Greer as Bishop of the Episcopal Diocese of New York.

References

External links
 

1854 births
1920 deaths
American publishers (people)
Episcopal bishops of New York
People from Chicago
Businesspeople from Grand Rapids, Michigan
Religious leaders from New York City
American Episcopalians
Michigan Wolverines baseball players
People from Pinckney, Michigan